XHCDU-FM is a radio station in Ciudad Acuña, Coahuila. Broadcasting on 92.9 FM, XHCDU carries a grupera format known as Super Estelar.

History
Televideo Mexicana received the concession for XHCDU in 1994. The station was sold to Radio Millenium, concessionaire for Grupo Zócalo and owner of radio and TV stations in Piedras Negras and Saltillo.

References

External links
Super Estelar 92.9 FM Facebook

Spanish-language radio stations
Radio stations in Coahuila